Dr. Seuss on the Loose  is an American animated musical television special, first airing on CBS on October 15, 1973, and was sponsored by Nestlé. The special is hosted by The Cat in the Hat, who introduces animated adaptations of the Dr. Seuss stories The Sneetches, The Zax and Green Eggs and Ham. Allan Sherman reprised his role as the voice of The Cat in the Hat from the 1971 television special. Dr. Seuss on the Loose was Allen Sherman's final project. He died a little over a month later on November 20, 1973 (10 days shy of his 49th birthday). The special became a popular annual repeat for most of the decade until its last CBS showing on July 12, 1979.

The special aired in various countries in 1975, including ITV in England on January 1, and ABC-TV in Australia on September 21.

The anthology was released as Green Eggs and Ham and Other Stories for a sing-along videocassette distributed by Fox Video and released in 1994 (later re-printed in 1997) and a Blu-ray deluxe edition released in 2012.

Plot

The Sneetches 
The first (and longest) story in the collection tells of a group of yellow bird-like creatures called the Sneetches, some of whom have a green star on their bellies. At the beginning of the story, Sneetches with stars discriminate against and shun those without, as shown by a star-bellied youngster being instructed by his parents, then going outside and ignoring a non-starred Sneetch saying a simple good morning. The star-bellied Sneetches sing a song about their greatness by having a party on the beach, where the unstarred Sneetches are excluded. 
An entrepreneur named Sylvester McMonkey McBean (calling himself the Fix-It-Up Chappie) appears and offers the Sneetches without stars the chance to get them with his Star-On machine, for three dollars. The treatment is instantly popular, but this angers the Star-bellied Sneetches, who have not only lost their special status, they cannot discriminate which Sneetch is which. McBean does not share the prejudice of the Sneetches, only caring that he has paying customers, and offers another machine called Star-Off, which removes stars for ten dollars. Soon Sneetches are running from one machine to the next.
 "...until neither the Plain nor the Star-Bellies knew
 whether this one was that one... or that one was this one...
 or which one was what one... or what one was who".
This continues until the Sneetches are penniless and McBean dismantles his machines, tipping his hat to the Sneetches and driving away a rich man. He looks directly at the camera, directly telling the viewer "you can never teach a Sneetch". However, the narrator says McBean was wrong, as the Sneetches learn from this experience that neither plain-belly nor star-belly Sneetches are superior, and they are able to get along and become friends. The sketch ends with a reprise of the beach party song, with the lyrics now reflecting how they are accepting of each other.

The Zax 
In "The Zax", a North-going Zax and a South-going Zax bump face to face on the Prairie of Prax. Each one asks the other to make way, but neither budges, saying it is against their upbringing to move any other way. Because they stubbornly refuse to move (east, west, or any direction except their respective headings) to get past each other, the two Zax then face off against each other with their arms crossed, thinking if they stand still, the world will too. The Zax stand so long through nights, weather, and seasons, that eventually, they didn't realize that the world didn't stand still, the world grew, because after a couple years, a freeway is built around them with a highway overpass over them. The story ends with the Zax still standing there "unbudged" in their tracks.

Green Eggs and Ham 
In "Green Eggs and Ham", Sam-I-Am offers an unnamed man to eat a plate of green eggs and ham. However, the man refuses multiple times by responding, "I do not like green eggs and ham. I do not like them, Sam-I-Am." Sam further asks him to eat them in various locations (House, box, car, tree, train, dark, rain, and boat) and with some animals (Mouse, fox, and goat), but is still rebuffed. A running gag exclusive to this short not in the book is the fox in the box being hunted by several dogs and fox hunters on horseback. Finally, the man vainly accepts the offer and samples the green eggs and ham. When the man declares he likes the food, he happily says, "I do so like green eggs and ham. Thank you. Thank you, Sam-I-Am."

Voice cast 
 Allan Sherman – The Cat in the Hat
 Hans Conried – Narrator, North-going Zax, South-going Zax, Fox
 Paul Winchell – Sam-I-Am, Sam’s Friend, Plain-Bellied Sneetches, Star-Bellied Sneetches
 Bob Holt – Sylvester McMonkey McBean, Plain-Bellied Sneetches, Star-Bellied Sneetches

Trivia 
 In the Green Eggs and Ham segment, a running gag is that a fox-hunting party with a pack of hounds and two horseback riders chases The Fox every time the word "Fox" gets mentioned.

Subsequent releases 
In October 2003, it was released on DVD by Universal Studios Home Entertainment/Universal Studios Family Productions, paired with Halloween is Grinch Night. In June 2012, Warner Home Video remastered and re-released the special on a special deluxe edition Blu-ray and DVD. In March 2021, the special was released on digital retailer sites under the title Dr. Seuss's Green Eggs and Ham and Other Treats, with Pontoffel Pock, Where Are You? and The Butter Battle Book also included as extras (which were remastered in high definition exclusively for this release).

See also 
 Dr. Seuss's ABC
 Hop on Pop
 One Fish, Two Fish, Red Fish, Blue Fish
 The Cat in the Hat Comes Back

References

External links 

 

1973 television specials
1973 television films
1973 animated films
1973 films
1973 in American television
1970s American television specials
1970s animated television specials
1970s American animated films
Dr. Seuss television specials
Television shows written by Dr. Seuss
Animated anthology films
CBS original programming
Musical television specials
CBS television specials
Television specials by DePatie–Freleng Enterprises
Films scored by Dean Elliott
The Cat in the Hat
Films directed by Hawley Pratt